Clatworthy "Charlie" Rennox (25 February 1897 – 1967) was a Scottish footballer. His regular position was as a forward. He was born in Shotts. He played for Dykehead, Wishaw, Clapton Orient, Manchester United and Grimsby Town. Rennox was signed to Manchester United from March 1925 to July 1927.

References

External links
MUFCInfo.com profile

1897 births
1967 deaths
Scottish footballers
Leyton Orient F.C. players
Manchester United F.C. players
Grimsby Town F.C. players
Sportspeople from Shotts
Association football forwards
Footballers from North Lanarkshire
English Football League players